Rhinehart Ranch, also known as Spring Valley Ranch, is a historic home located near Eminence, Shannon County, Missouri.  It was built in 1907, and is a two-story vernacular I-house with a one-story rear wing.  It features a double verandah on the front facade.

It was listed on the National Register of Historic Places in 1980.

References

Houses on the National Register of Historic Places in Missouri
Houses completed in 1907
Buildings and structures in Shannon County, Missouri
National Register of Historic Places in Shannon County, Missouri